The Rosa E. True School is an historic property on Park Street in Portland, Maine's West End. It opened as a public school in 1844 and closed in 1972; upon the closing of the school, it had been in continuous use longer than any other school in the country.

In 1971, school principal Rodney E. Wells was charged with violating Maine's right to know laws when he withheld the school's enrollment information from a parent concerned over the hiring of a school employee.

In 1987, the historic preservation group Greater Portland Landmarks began involvement with the Rose True School with a 5,000 dollar revolving loan to help convert the property into a multi-unit apartment building.

In 1992, the property was converted into 8 low income apartments primarily through local anti-gentrification efforts and the availability of tax credits. The redevelopment of the property also resulted in $900,000 put into the local economy and job training for young people.

References

Educational institutions established in 1844
Educational institutions disestablished in 1972
Defunct schools in Portland, Maine
Apartment buildings in Portland, Maine
West End (Portland, Maine)
School buildings completed in 1844